The Anchorage Fire Department (AFD) provides fire protection and emergency medical services to the city of Anchorage, Alaska. Areas that are served by department include the incorporated areas of downtown Anchorage, Bird, Bootleggers Cove, Eagle River, Fairview, Indian, Mountain View, Muldoon, and Spenard, among others. AFD is assisted by two volunteer fire departments operating in the outlying areas of the Anchorage Municipality.

History

The Anchorage Fire Department was founded in 1915. By 1951, AFD had grown to 50 fire fighters, and saw the beginning of Anchorage's first ambulance service. In 1967, the various fire companies unified as the Greater Anchorage Area Borough Fire Department. In 1975,  the City of Anchorage and the Greater Anchorage Borough unified, becoming the Municipality of Anchorage.

As of 2015, the AFD has a goal of maintaining 315 fire fighters and paramedics on active duty.

In June 2018, Deputy Chief Jodie Hettrick was promoted to Fire Chief following the retirement of Denis LeBlanc. Chief Hettrick is the first woman to serve as Chief of the Anchorage Fire Department.

Stations and apparatus

Volunteer Fire Departments 
AFD is assisted by two volunteer fire/rescue departments that provide fire protection and EMS services to the outlying areas of the Anchorage Municipality. In the north, Chugiak Volunteer Fire & Rescue Company, Inc. operates five stations and serves an area from the North Eagle River overpass on the Glenn Highway to the Municipal boundary at the Knik River under the leadership of Chief Tim Benningfield and two assistant chiefs. In the south, Girdwood Fire & Rescue, Inc. operates one station and serves the Girdwood community and other communities along the Seward Highway under the leadership of Chief Michelle Weston and one deputy chief. Both departments provide 24/7/365 advanced life support coverage to their respective areas, and stations 31 and 41 are staffed by volunteer duty crews 24/7.

References

1915 establishments in Alaska
Fire departments in Alaska
Government agencies established in 1915
Fire